Sixty-Six Books was a set of plays premiered at the Bush Theatre, London, in 2011, to mark the theatre's reopening on a new site and the 400th anniversary of the King James Version. It drew its title from the 66 books of the Protestant Bible. The special show ran from 10 October 10 to 29 October 2011, with special 24-hour shows on 15 and 29 October; the production featured 130 actors, including Miranda Raison, Ralf Little, Billy Bragg, and Rafe Spall.

List of plays

References

External links

"Sixty-Six Books: 21st-century writers speak to the King James Bible: A Contemporary Response to the King James Bible", Oberon Books, 2012-05-02.

2011 plays
400th anniversary of the King James Version